Qadura Fares was a Palestinian Authority minister without portfolio under Prime Minister Ahmed Qurei from 2003 to 2005, and a member of the Palestinian Legislative Council for Fatah from 1996 to 2006. He is a close friend, aide and adviser to senior Fatah leader Marwan Barghouti.  Fares is regarded as one of the principal architects of Fatah's 'young guard' movement, who briefly formed the al-Mustaqbal or "Future" list (2005) before joining with Mahmoud Abbas to form a united Fatah list for the upcoming elections.

Fares was not nominated in the united list for the 2006 elections, and ran unsuccessfully as an independent in the Ramallah district. Also, since at least 2011, Fares has been consistently referred to as the "head" of the Palestinian Prisoners Club, so it is unclear exactly what position Fares actually holds as he is not listed as either the President nor the Executive Director of the club, positions clearly identified with other individuals.

In 2003, he was appointed Minister of State for the Affairs of  Colonization and Wall Resistance Commission.

References

Interview with Fares
Fatah Splits, With Marwan Barghouti and Younger Leaders Forming New Party

External links
Qadura Fares stated he will respect Barghouti decision not to run for election
A washington post article that briefly quotes Qadura Fares

Fatah members
Year of birth missing (living people)
Living people
Government ministers of the Palestinian National Authority
Members of the 1996 Palestinian Legislative Council
People from Ramallah and al-Bireh Governorate
State ministers of Palestine